= Meor Hatalmud =

Yeshiva Meor Hatalmud
- מאור התלמוד

Location
- 1368 39th St; Brooklyn, New York; United States
- Coordinates: 40.639434°N 73.984782°W

Information
- Type: Yeshiva
- Religious affiliation: Orthodox
- Grades: 9th grade - 12th grade
- Gender: Male
  - Grade 9: 30
  - Grade 10: 28
  - Grade 11: 36
  - Grade 12: 34
- Student to teacher ratio: 14:1
- Nickname: Moshe Weiss Yeshiva

Yeshiva Meor Hatalmud is a Yeshiva in New York City headed by Moshe Weiss.

== Overview ==
The Yeshiva Ketana serves students from the age of 14 to 17 and has an enrollment of 128 boys, grades 9–12.
